The stork-billed kingfisher (Pelargopsis capensis), is a tree kingfisher which is widely but sparsely distributed in the tropical Indian subcontinent and Southeast Asia, from India to Indonesia. This kingfisher is resident throughout its range.

The adult has a green back, blue wings and tail, and olive-brown head. Its underparts and neck are buff. The very large bill and legs are bright red. The flight of the stork-billed kingfisher is laboured and flapping, but direct. Sexes are similar. There are 13 races or subspecies, differing mostly in plumage detail, but P. c. gigantea of the Sulu Archipelago in the Philippines has a white head, neck and underparts. The call of this noisy kingfisher is a low and far reaching peer-por-por repeated about every 5 seconds, as well cackling ke-ke-ke-ke-ke-ke.

The stork-billed kingfisher lives in a variety of well-wooded habitats near lakes, rivers, or coasts. It perches quietly whilst seeking food, and is often inconspicuous despite its size. It is territorial and will chase away eagles and other large predators. This species hunts fish, frogs, crabs, rodents and young birds.

Adults dig their nests in river banks, decaying trees, or tree termite nests. A clutch of two to five round white eggs is typical.

Taxonomy

The first formal description of the stork-billed kingfisher was by the Swedish naturalist Carl Linnaeus in 1766 in the 12th edition of his Systema Naturae. He coined the binomial name Alcedo capensis. Linnaeus based his description on Mathurin Jacques Brisson's "Le martin-pescheur du Cap de Bonne Espérance". Brisson believed his specimen had come from the Cape of Good Hope region of South Africa. The species does not occur in Africa and it was suggested that the specimen had been obtained on the Indonesian island of Java. The specimen is now known to have come from near Chandannagar in West Bengal, India. Linnaeus's specific epithet capensis denotes the Cape of Good Hope. The current genus Pelargopsis was introduced by the German zoologist Constantin Gloger in 1841.

Thirteen subspecies are recognised:

 P. c. capensis (Linnaeus, 1766) – Nepal through India to Sri Lanka
 P. c. osmastoni (Baker, ECS, 1934) – Andaman Islands
 P. c. intermedia Hume, 1874 – Nicobar Islands
 P. c. burmanica Sharpe, 1870 – Myanmar to Indochina and south to north Malay Peninsula
 P. c. malaccensis Sharpe, 1870 – central and south Malay Peninsula, Riau Archipelago and Lingga Islands
 P. c. cyanopteryx (Oberholser, 1909) – Sumatra, Bangka Island and Belitung Island
 P. c. simalurensis Richmond, 1903 – Simeulue Island  (off the west coast of the island of Sumatra in Indonesia)
 P. c. sodalis Richmond, 1903 – Banyak, Nias, Batu and Mentawai Islands (off the west coast of Sumatra)
 P. c. innominata (van Oort, 1910) – Borneo
 P. c. javana (Boddaert, 1783) – Java
 P. c. floresiana Sharpe, 1870 – Bali to Flores  (Lesser Sunda Islands)
 P. c. gouldi Sharpe, 1870 – north Philippines
 P. c. gigantea Walden, 1874 – central and south Philippines
The insular forms nesoeca on the Nias and Batu Islands as well as isoptera on Mentawai Island are here subsumed within sodalis. Prior to the change of type locality to Chandannagar, the birds in India were placed in the subspecies gurial but this race is now synonymized with the nominate race capensis.

Gallery

References

External links

 Xeno-canto: audio recordings of the stork-billed kingfisher

stork-billed kingfisher
Birds of Bangladesh
Birds of India
Birds of Sri Lanka
Birds of Southeast Asia
stork-billed kingfisher
stork-billed kingfisher